Rafal may refer to:

People 

 Rafal E. Dunin-Borkowski (born 1969), British experimental physicist
 Rafal Kiernicki (1912–1995), Roman Catholic prelate from Ukraine
 Rafal Korc (born 1982), Polish Paralympic athlete

Places 
Rafal, Alicante, Valencia, Spain

See also 
Rafał, the Polish form of the male given name Raphael
 Rafał of Tarnów, Polish nobleman